Eion Crossan  (born 10 May 1967 in New Zealand) is a New Zealand former Rugby Footballer who played Rugby Union for Southland and Bay of Plenty between 1987 and 1996, and Rugby League for the South Sydney Rabbitohs and Cronulla-Sutherland Sharks between 1992 and 1995.

Playing career

Rugby Union
Crosson played for Southland and Bay of Plenty between 1987 and 1996.

He played 49 games for Southland and 28 games for Bay of Plenty

He scored all 12 points (4 penalty goals) for Southland Rugby Union club, to guide them to victory over France in 1989.

Rugby League
He played rugby league between 1992 and 1995 in the ARL competition. During this time he played for the South Sydney Rabbitohs and Cronulla-Sutherland Sharks.

He was well renowned as an accurate goal kicker at the time, and finished the 1992 season with a 78% kicking record, which was not far behind Daryl Halligan.

During a Charity Shield game, playing for Souths, he had his nose broken by Dragons player David Barnhill.

1993 saw Crossan playing reserve grade for South Sydney. In 1994 he switched to Cronulla-Sutherland and played for them until the end of the 1995 season.

In the ARL, he scored a total of 324 points, including 140 goals at 70%. He also scored 11 tries.

References

External links
 Sharks Forever Forums -

1967 births
Living people
New Zealand rugby league players
South Sydney Rabbitohs players
Cronulla-Sutherland Sharks players
Rugby union players from the Bay of Plenty Region
New Zealand rugby union players
Rugby league wingers
Southland rugby union players
Bay of Plenty rugby union players
Rugby union wings
Rugby league players from the Bay of Plenty Region